Patricia Kathryn Helms Kidd (April 3, 1950 – December 14, 2015) was an American author. Many of her books concern the Church of Jesus Christ of Latter-day Saints (LDS Church). She co-wrote some of her works with her husband, Clark L. Kidd, and also co-wrote a novel with Orson Scott Card.

Life and career
Kidd was born in New Orleans and raised in Mandeville, Louisiana. She graduated from Brigham Young University and was baptized in the LDS Church. Raised a Protestant, Kidd is quoted as converting because she wanted a patriarchal blessing, but couldn't receive one unless she was a baptized member of the LDS faith. Upon receiving her bachelor's degree, Kidd reported for the Deseret News in Salt Lake City. At the same time, Orson Scott Card was an assistant editor for the popular LDS magazine The Ensign; Kidd and Card became good friends. Card was a witness at Kathryn (Kathy) and Clark Kidd's wedding. The couple worked with Card on a project for Compute! Books. Clark programmed the games in a series while Kathy wrote the directions. The couple moved to Virginia in 1987. She was subsequently associate and managing editor of Meridian magazine until 2008, after which she continued writing for it and also for Nauvoo Times. She died on December 14, 2015.

Publications
Kidd wrote and co-wrote with her husband several non-fiction books of practical advice geared toward fellow members of the LDS Church. These include titles such as Ward Activities for the Clueless, Food Storage for the Clueless, On My Own and Clueless: An LDS Guide to Independent Life, and A Parent's Survival Guide to the Internet. The Kidds jointly authored A Convert's Guide to Mormon Life, which won an Association of Mormon Letters Award for devotional literature. They also collaborated on a large number of articles for Meridian.

Kidd also wrote a few comedic novels about life among members of the church, including Paradise Vue and Return to Paradise, and children's books such as The Innkeeper's Daughter.

Kidd was a longtime friend of Orson Scott Card. In 1989, Card started up a Mormon publishing company with his wife and brother, called "Hatrack River Publications." Card approached Kidd to provide a novel that fit the company's themes. Kidd's novel Paradise Vue became its first publication. Other collaboration with Card included co-authoring Lovelock, the first part of a proposed trilogy.

Lovelock 

Lovelock is a speculative science fiction novel co-written by both Kidd and Orson Scott Card. The novel is narrated by a scientist who takes the name of real scientist James Lovelock. The novel examines the Gaia Hypothesis through the lens of Lovelock, who is a genetically-enhanced capuchin monkey. Lovelock the monkey is assigned to examine the lives of several humans on board the Mayflower spacecraft, and in the process becomes more humanized and rebellious.

Kidd passed away before the second installment, Rasputin, could be published.

Paradise Vue 
Paradise Vue takes place in an LDS ward congregation. Beneath their perfectionist façade, the Church members in Kidd's novel exhibit cruel, dark, and obsessive tendencies. The novel is a comedic LDS fiction piece.

Works

Mayflower trilogy 

 Lovelock (New York: TOR, 1994)

Paradise Vue series 

 Paradise Vue (Hatrack River Publications, 1989)
 Return to Paradise (Hatrack River, 1997)

For the Clueless series 

 Food Storage for the Clueless (Bookcraft, 2002)
 Ward Activities for the Clueless (Bookcraft, 2001)
 On My Own and Clueless: an LDS Guide to Independent Life (Bookcraft, 2000)

Standalone fiction 

 The Alphabet Year (Hatrack River, 1991)
 The Wise Men of Bountiful: a Story for Children (Cedar Fort, 2005)
 The Innkeeper's Daughter (Hatrack River, 1990)
 A Convert's Guide to Mormon Life (Bookcraft, 1998)
 52 Weeks of Recipes for Students, Missionaries, and Nervous Cooks (Deseret Book, 2007)
 A Parent's Survival Guide to the Internet (Bookcraft, 1999)

Manuals 

 Compute!'s IBM PC and PCjr Games for Kids (Compute! Publications, 1984)

(All works were retrieved from the WorldCat).

References

External links
Planet Kathy, Kidd's website, archived at the Wayback Machine on January 9, 2016

1950 births
2015 deaths
Converts to Mormonism
20th-century American novelists
American Latter Day Saint writers
American science fiction writers
American women novelists
Women science fiction and fantasy writers
20th-century American women writers
Writers from New Orleans
People from Mandeville, Louisiana
Novelists from Louisiana
Latter Day Saints from Louisiana
Latter Day Saints from Virginia
American women non-fiction writers
21st-century American women
Harold B. Lee Library-related articles